The 2017 Sun Hung Kai Properties Hong Kong Challenge was the inaugural edition of the Hong Kong Challenge one-day race. The race was held on October 8, and was rated as a 1.1 event on the UCI Asia Tour.

Matej Mohorič of Slovenia won the race, followed by Robbie Hucker of Australia second and Yukiya Arashiro of Japan third.

Teams
Seventeen teams participated in the race. Each team had a maximum of six riders:

Results

General classification

List of teams and riders
A total of 18 teams, including two WorldTeams, one Professional Continental team, 13 Continental teams, and 2 national teams, were invited to participate in the 2017 SHKP Hong Kong Challenge. As Kuwaiti continental team Nice Cycling Team was unable to attend, there were 93 riders in remaining 17 teams took part in the race

 
  Luka Mezgec
  Mathew Hayman
  Luke Durbridge
  Mitchell Docker
  Sam Bewley
  Michael Hepburn
 
  Andrea Guardini
  Ben Swift
  Matej Mohorič
  Seid Lizde
 
  Martin Laas
  Mikel Aristi
  Benjamin Giraud
  Quentin Pacher
  Jonathan Couanon
  Ben Dyball
 
  Hayato Okamoto
  Kota Sumiyoshi
  Shiki Kuroeda
  Hiroaki Harada
 
  Harry Tanfield
  Max Stedman
  Chris Opie
  Mitchell Webber
  Rob Partridge
  Dexter Gardias
 
  Travis Samuel
  Ryan Macanally
  Jure Rupnik
  Alexis Cartier
  Marc-Antonie Nadon
  Chris Prendergast

 
  Yang Tao
  Antonio Jose Alarcon Gonzalez
  Kevin Rios Quintana
  Steven Cuesta
  Juan Carrero
 
  Leung Chun Wing
  Ho Burr
  Choy Hiu Fung
  Mow Ching Yin
  Leung Ka Yu
  Ko Siu Wai
 
  Sean Lake
  Anthony Giacoppo
  Robbie Hucker
  Neil Van der Ploeg
  Sam Crome
 
  Māris Bogdanovičs
  Andris Vosekalns
  Armands Bēcis
  Deins Kaņepējs
  Uldis Ālītis
 
  Mauricio Ortega
  Eugenio Bani
  Paolo Lunardon
  Oscar Mauricio Pachón
  Polychronis Tzortzakis
  Cristian Andres Peña
 
  Jon Aberasturi
  Michimasa Nakai
  Yusuke Hatanaka
  Eiichi Hirai
  Tanzo Tokuda

 
  James Knox
  Scott Davies
  Joey Walker
  Etienne Georgi
  Robert Scott
  Jake Kelly
 
  Anuar Manan
  Che ku Mohammad Nazmi Che Ku Romli
  Maral-Erdene Batmunkh
  Mohd Nor Umardi Rosdi
  Goh Choon Huat
  Muhammad Nur Aimin Mohd Zariff
 
  Fan Xiaojun
  Li Wenjie
  Yu Benneng
  Zhong Zirong
  Meng Juntao
  Zhang Lianshan
 Japan
  Yukiya Arashiro
  Hideto Nakane
  Rei Onodera
  Shotaro Iribe
  Masaki Yamamoto
  Masahiro Ishigami
 Romania
  Lars Pria
  Valentin Plesea
  Eduard-Michael Grosu
  Daniel Crista
  Emil Dima

References

External links
 
 2017 Sun Hung Kai Properties Hong Kong Challenge at procyclingstats.com

Sun Hung Kai Properties Hong Kong Challenge
Sun Hung Kai Properties Hong Kong Challenge